The Dickinson Micropolitan Statistical Area, as defined by the United States Census Bureau, is an area consisting of two counties in North Dakota, anchored by the city of Dickinson. As of the 2010 census, the μSA had a population of 24,982 (a July 1, 2019 estimate placed the population at 32,417).

Counties
Billings
Stark

Communities
Places with more than 20,000 inhabitants
Dickinson (Principal city)
Places with 500 to 1,000 inhabitants
Belfield
Richardton
Places with less than 500 inhabitants
Gladstone
Medora
South Heart
Taylor
Unincorporated places
Fairfield
Lefor

Demographics

As of the census of 2000, there were 23,524 people, 9,298 households, and 6,132 families residing within the μSA. The racial makeup of the μSA was 97.56% White, 0.22% African American, 0.91% Native American, 0.22% Asian, 0.03% Pacific Islander, 0.28% from other races, and 0.79% from two or more races. Hispanic or Latino of any race were 1.02% of the population.

The median income for a household in the μSA was $32,597, and the median income for a family was $38,639. Males had a median income of $31,487 versus $20,500 for females. The per capita income for the μSA was $16,058.

See also
Micropolitan statistical area
North Dakota census statistical areas

References